Carranza is a Hispanic surname of Basque origins. Notable people with the surname include:

Europe

Spain
Bartolomé Carranza (1503–76), Spanish theologian
Jerónimo Sánchez de Carranza (1539–1600), Spanish soldier, author, and fencing master
 (1892-1969), Spanish soldier, commander, and Francoist
Maite Carranza (born 1958), Catalan author
Ramón de Carranza, former mayor of Cádiz, Spain, and namesake of the Ramón de Carranza Trophy

North America

Costa Rica
Bruno Carranza Ramirez (1822–1891), president of Costa Rica
Miguel Carranza Fernández, Costa Rican politician
 (1819-1895), former president of the Supreme Court
Ricardo Toledo Carranza, politician
Manuel Carranza Vargas, painter

Mexico
Alejandrina "Connie" Carranza Ancheta, Mexican representative and contestant of Miss Universe 1986
Carlos María Abascal Carranza (1949–2008), Mexican politician, former Secretary of the Interior
Diego Carranza (born 1559), Mexican Dominican missionary
Dulce Carranza (born 1990), professional volleyball player
, Mexican actress during the Golden Age of Mexican cinema
Emilio Carranza (1905–1928), Mexican aviator
Jesús Carranza, Mexican colonel
, Mexican colonel and revolutionary, nephew of Venustiano Carranza
Venustiano Carranza (1859–1920), Mexican revolutionary, politician and president of Mexico

Nicaragua
Margarita Carranza, wife of the president of Nicaragua José Maria Moncada

Puerto Rico
Norma Carranza, politician for the New Progressive Party of Puerto Rico

United States
Jovita Carranza (born 1949), 44th Treasurer of the United States
Richard Carranza, Chancellor of the New York City Department of Education
Robert Carranza, Grammy-winning producer for Los Lobos, Marilyn Manson, and others.

South America

Argentina
Adolfo Carranza (1857–1914), lawyer and historian who established the National Historical Museum
, historian, lawyer, and biographer
Cecilia Carranza Saroli (born 1986), Olympic sailor
César Carranza (born 1980), professional soccer player
Julián Carranza, footballer from Oncativo, plays for Philadelphia Union.
Roque Carranza (1919–1986), politician

Colombia
 (1913–1985), poet
María Mercedes Carranza (1945–2003), poet and journalist from Bogota
Víctor Carranza (1935–2013), mine owner

Peru
José Luis Carranza (born 1964), professional soccer player
Luis Carranza (born 1966), economist and former Minister of Economy and Finance

Venezuela
Antonio José Carranza (1817-1893), painter from Caracas
Ramón Carranza (1940–2003), saxophonist and composer

Asia

Philippines
Alvin Carranza, owner of Global Makati F.C. a soccer club based in Makati, Metro Manila

References

See also
Carranza (disambiguation)

Basque-language surnames
Spanish-language surnames